Mastophora phrynosoma is a species of orb weaver in the spider family Araneidae. It is found in the United States. Like all known species of the genus Mastophora, adult females are bolas spiders, capturing their prey with one or more sticky drops at the end of a single line of silk rather than in a web. Males and juvenile females capture their prey directly with their legs.

References

External links

 

Araneidae
Articles created by Qbugbot
Spiders described in 1955